Antonella Bogarín (born November 11, 1991) is an Argentine swimmer, who specialized in open water marathon events. She represented her nation Argentina at the 2008 Summer Olympics, finishing twenty-fourth in the inaugural open water marathon.

Bogarin competed as a lone female open water swimmer for Argentina in the 10 km marathon at the 2008 Summer Olympics in Beijing. Leading up to the Games, she placed twelfth in the 10 km Marathon Swimming Olympic test event at Shunyi Olympic Rowing-Canoeing Park. Bogarin finished the grueling race in twenty-fourth place with a total time of 2:11:35.9, approximately twelve minutes behind winner Larisa Ilchenko of Russia.

References

External links
NBC Olympics Profile

1991 births
Living people
Argentine female swimmers
Olympic swimmers of Argentina
Swimmers at the 2008 Summer Olympics
Female long-distance swimmers
Sportspeople from Santa Fe, Argentina
South American Games bronze medalists for Argentina
South American Games medalists in swimming
Competitors at the 2010 South American Games
20th-century Argentine women
21st-century Argentine women